In enzymology, an undecaprenyldiphospho-muramoylpentapeptide beta-N-acetylglucosaminyltransferase is an enzyme that catalyzes the chemical reaction

UDP-N-acetylglucosamine + Mur2Ac(oyl-L-Ala-gamma-D-Glu-L-Lys-D-Ala-D-Ala)-diphosphoundecaprenol  UDP + GlcNAc-(1->4)-Mur2Ac(oyl-L-Ala-gamma-D-Glu-L-Lys-D-Ala-D-Ala)-diphosphoundecaprenol

The 2 substrates of this enzyme are UDP-N-acetylglucosamine and Mur2Ac(oyl-L-Ala-gamma-D-Glu-L-Lys-D-Ala-D-Ala)-diphosphoundecaprenol, whereas its 2 products are UDP and Lipid II.

This enzyme belongs to the family of glycosyltransferases, specifically the hexosyltransferases.  The systematic name of this enzyme class is UDP-N-acetyl-D-glucosamine:N-acetyl-alpha-D-muramyl(oyl-L-Ala-gamma- D-Glu-L-Lys-D-Ala-D-Ala)-diphosphoundecaprenol beta-1,4-N-acetylglucosaminlytransferase.  Another name in common use is MurG transferase.  This enzyme participates in peptidoglycan biosynthesis.

Variant reactions producing modified cell walls include (not muturally exclusive):
 Replacement of lysine residue with meso-diaminopimelate combined with adjacent residues through its L-centre, as it is in Gram-negative and some Gram-positive organisms.
 Use of mono-trans,octa-cis-decaprenyl instead of the conventional di-trans,octa-cis-undecaprenol moiety, as found in Mycobacterium.

References 

 

EC 2.4.1
Enzymes of unknown structure